Guitton or Guiton is a French surname. Notable persons with that surname include:

Persons with the surname Guitton
 Abraham Duquesne-Guitton (1648–1724), French naval commander
 Helga Guitton, German radio and TV presenter 
 Jean Guitton (1901–1999), French Catholic philosopher

Persons with the surname Guiton
 Jean Guiton (1585–1654), Mayor of La Rochelle and naval commander